Izayoi (written: 十六夜 lit. "Sixteenth Night"), is a  Japanese family surname. Fictional people with the surname include:

Izayoi, a character from the Japanese manga series Inuyasha.
Izayoi, a character from the BlazBlue fighting game series.
Sakamaki Izayoi, the main protagonist from the Japanese light novel series Problem Children are Coming from Another World, aren't they?.
Sakuya Izayoi, a character from bullet hell shoot 'em up video game series Touhou Project.
Miku Izayoi, a character from the a Japanese light novel series Date A Live.
Aki Izayoi, a character from the second main spin-off of the Yu-Gi-Oh! franchise, Yu-Gi-Oh! 5D's.
Kyuemon Izayoi, also known as Kyuemon Shingetsu Kibaoni, a secondary villain from the 39th season of Super Sentai Series, Shuriken Sentai Ninninger.
Sonosuke Izayoi, a character from the second anime series based in the Danganronpa video game, Danganronpa 3: The End of Hope's Peak Academy.

Japanese-language surnames